Russell Irving "Russ" Webb (born June 1, 1945) is a retired water polo player from the United States. He played in two consecutive Summer Olympics for his native country, starting in 1968. He won a bronze medal with the Men's National Team at the 1972 Summer Olympics in Munich, West Germany. In 1984, he was inducted into the USA Water Polo Hall of Fame. He is now a practicing oral surgeon in Claremont, California.

See also
 List of Olympic medalists in water polo (men)

References

External links
 

1945 births
Living people
American male swimmers
American male water polo players
Swimmers at the 1967 Pan American Games
Water polo players at the 1968 Summer Olympics
Water polo players at the 1972 Summer Olympics
Olympic bronze medalists for the United States in water polo
Place of birth missing (living people)
Medalists at the 1972 Summer Olympics
Pan American Games gold medalists for the United States
Pan American Games silver medalists for the United States
Pan American Games medalists in swimming
American water polo coaches
Medalists at the 1967 Pan American Games